The MTV Video Music Award for Best Editing is a craft award given to the artist, the artist's manager, and the editor of the music video. From 1984 to 2007, the award's full name was Best Editing in a Video, before acquiring its current name in 2008.

The biggest winners are Jarrett Fijal and Ken Mowe with three wins each. Jim Haygood, Eric Zumbrunnen, and Robert Duffy follow closely behind with two wins each. The most nominated editor is Jarrett Fijal with eight followed by Robert Duffy with seven.  Closely following them is Jim Haygood with six nominations. The performer whose videos have won the most awards is Beyoncé. Likewise, Beyoncé's videos have received the most nominations with five. Beyoncé and Billie Eilish are the only performers to have won a Moonman in this category for their work co-editing 7/11 in 2015 and editing Bad Guy in 2019 respectively. However, three other performers have been nominated for their work co-editing videos: George Michael ("Freedom! '90"), Jared Leto ("Hurricane"), and Ryan Lewis ("Can't Hold Us")

Recipients

Notes

References

MTV Video Music Awards
Awards established in 1984
Film editing awards